I Was Jack Mortimer is a 1935 German thriller film directed by Carl Froelich and starring Anton Walbrook, Eugen Klöpfer, and Sybille Schmitz. It was shot at the Tempelhof Studios in Berlin. The film's sets were designed by the art director Franz Schroedter. It is an adaptation of the 1933 novel of the same title by Alexander Lernet-Holenia.

Synopsis
Fred is a struggling Budapest taxi driver, is frustrated because he wants to marry his girlfriend Marie whose Russian emigre work in one of the city's cheap restaurants. His big break seems to come one day when he assists a wealthy woman with the engine of her car and is hired by her to act as her chauffeur on a trip down to Monte Carlo on very good wages. On the same day celebrated conductor Pedro Montemayor arrives in the city for a concert, accompanied by his wife Winifred. His jealous, domineering nature has led her into a romance with American Jack Mortimer, who is also scheduled to arrive in the city that day and stay at the same hotel.

Shortly after Fred picks up Mortimer in his taxi from the station, Montemayor shoots him dead from another car, having already been aware of his arrival. An alarmed Fred at first tries to go to the police, but finding them uninterested and suddenly alarmed that he will be blamed for the murder, dumps the body several miles away. He goes to his new employer and explains what happens, but she dismisses him. Increasingly desperate, he realises that if the American was known to have turned up at the hotel, he couldn't possibly have died in his taxi. He changes into his elegant clothes and goes to impersonate him at the hotel for a brief time to establish his own alibi. Things go wrong when both Winifred and then her husband turn up and his fake identity is exposed.

With the police now on his trail Fred plans to escape the city, and Marie tries to assist him by getting some money from his apartment. She is pursued by detectives to a dance hall where she meets up with Fred again. Just as thing seem hopeless for him, Montemayor confesses to the crime. Fred explains to the investing officers about why the dead American had turned up at his hotel, saying "I was Jack Mortimer".

Cast

See also
Adventure in Vienna (1952)
Stolen Identity (1953)

References

External links

1935 films
Films of Nazi Germany
German thriller films
1930s thriller films
Films directed by Carl Froelich
Films based on Austrian novels
Films about identity theft
Tobis Film films
German black-and-white films
Films about taxis
1930s German-language films
Films shot at Tempelhof Studios
Films set in Budapest
1930s German films